Sarah Caroline Sinclair  ( Colman; born 30 January 1974), known professionally as Olivia Colman, is an English actress. Known for her comedic and dramatic roles in film and television, she has received many accolades, including an Academy Award, a British Academy Film Award, two Emmy Awards, three British Academy Television Awards, and three Golden Globe Awards.

A graduate of the Bristol Old Vic Theatre School, Colman's breakthrough came in the Channel 4 sitcom Peep Show (2003–2015). Her other comedic roles on television include Green Wing (2004–2006), That Mitchell and Webb Look (2006–2008), Beautiful People (2008–2009), Rev. (2010–2014), Flowers (2016–2018), and Fleabag (2016–2019). Colman received the BAFTA Award for Best Female Comedy Performance for the comedy programme Twenty Twelve (2011–2012) and Best Supporting Actress for the crime programme Accused (2012).

She was acclaimed for her performance in the ITV crime-drama series Broadchurch (2013–2017), for which she received a British Academy Television Award for Best Actress. Colman also appeared in the BBC One thriller miniseries The Night Manager (2016), for which she received a Golden Globe Award for Best Supporting Actress – Series, Miniseries or Television Film. She played Queen Elizabeth II from 2019 to 2020 in the Netflix period-drama series The Crown, for which she received a Golden Globe Award and a Primetime Emmy Award for Outstanding Lead Actress in a Drama Series. Other dramatic roles on television include Les Misérables (2019), Landscapers (2021), and Heartstopper (2022–present).

For her portrayal of Anne, Queen of Great Britain in the period black-comedy film The Favourite (2018), Colman received the Academy Award for Best Actress. She received additional Academy Award nominations for her performances in The Father (2020) and The Lost Daughter (2021). Other notable film credits include Hot Fuzz (2007), Tyrannosaur (2011), The Iron Lady (2011), Hyde Park on Hudson (2012), Locke (2013), The Lobster (2015), Murder on the Orient Express (2017), The Mitchells vs. the Machines (2021), Empire of Light (2022), and Puss in Boots: The Last Wish (2022).

Early life and education
Colman was born in Norwich on 30 January 1974, the daughter of nurse Mary (née Leakey) and chartered surveyor Keith Colman. She was privately educated at Norwich High School for Girls and Gresham's School in Holt, Norfolk. Colman's first role was Jean Brodie in a school production of The Prime of Miss Jean Brodie at age 16. She cites her mother's interrupted career as a ballet dancer as an inspiration to pursue acting professionally. Colman spent a term studying primary education at Homerton College, Cambridge before studying drama at the Bristol Old Vic Theatre School, from which she graduated in 1999. During her time at Cambridge, she appeared in the Channel 4 series The Word in 1995 under her nickname "Colly", auditioned for the Cambridge University Footlights Dramatic Club and met future co-stars David Mitchell and Robert Webb.

Colman had to adopt a different stage name when she began working professionally, because Equity (the UK actors' union) already had an actress named Sarah Colman. "One of my best friends at university was called Olivia and I always loved her name," Colman told The Independent in 2013. "I was never Sarah; I was always called by my nickname, Colly, so it didn't seem so awful not to be called Sarah."

Colman was a subject of the UK genealogy programme Who Do You Think You Are? in July 2018. Although she expected that her family tree would mainly relate to Norfolk, it was discovered that her fourth great-grandfather Richard Campbell Bazett was born on the island of Saint Helena and worked in London for the East India Company. Bazett's son, Colman's third great-grandfather Charles Bazett, married Harriot Slessor. Researchers discovered that she was born in the Indian city of Kishanganj, lost her British father at age three and made the journey to England alone. Slessor's passage was paid for by her paternal grandmother. The episode speculated that Slessor's mother might have been Indian, but did not present proof. After the episode aired, the Berkshire Record Office published the will of Slessor's mother; her name was Seraphina Donclere (evidently of European origin) and she died in 1810.

Career

2000s: Early work
Colman made her professional acting debut in 2000 at age 26 as part of the BBC Two comedy sketch show, Bruiser. She has appeared in a number of BBC, ITV and Channel 4 television series, such as People Like Us, Look Around You, Black Books, The Office and The Time of Your Life. Colman provided the voice-over for Channel 5's poll for Britain's Funniest Comedy Character.

She regularly appeared on BBC Radio 4 comedies, such as Concrete Cow, Think the Unthinkable, The House of Milton Jones and Dirk Gently's Holistic Detective Agency. Colman was the voice of Minka, the Polish secretary in the Radio 4 comedy Hut 33 set in a fictional code-breaking hut at Bletchley Park during World War II. Colman appeared as Bev, with Mark Burdis as Kev, in a series of television advertisements for AA car insurance. She provided voices for the Andrex "be kind to your behind" and Glade fragrance advertisements (playing a gorilla).

On several projects, Colman has worked with the comedians Mitchell and Webb. She joined them in 2003 to play Sophie in the Channel 4 comedy Peep Show. Other joint ventures have included radio's That Mitchell and Webb Sound and its television version, That Mitchell and Webb Look. She decided to leave the programme after her agent suggested that she was becoming too closely associated with their work and needed to widen her horizons, a decision which was made "with tears". Colman continued to appear on Peep Show less often until it ended in 2015.

She had a recurring role in the surrealist comedy Green Wing from 2004 to 2006. One of her earliest film credits is naturist Joanna Roberts in the 2006 mockumentary film Confetti, a role she has described as "the worst experience of my life".

In 2007, Colman starred as Alice in the comedy film Grow Your Own and as PC Doris Thatcher in the action comedy film Hot Fuzz. She also played a lead role in Paddy Considine's short film Dog Altogether. She appeared in October and November 2008 in the BBC sitcom Beautiful People (based on the life of Simon Doonan) as Debbie Doonan, Simon's mother. Colman made a guest appearance in the episode "Naomi" of the series Skins as Naomi's mother, Gina.

2010s: Breakthrough and worldwide recognition
Colman had a lead role in 2010 as Alex Smallbone, the wife of an inner-city vicar, in the BBC sitcom Rev. starring Tom Hollander; the series ran from 2010 to 2014. She guest-starred that year in "The Eleventh Hour" episode of Doctor Who, Matt Smith's debut as the Eleventh Doctor. Colman appeared the following year in the BBC drama Exile, written by Danny Brocklehurst and starring John Simm and Jim Broadbent. From 2011 to 2012 she played Ian Fletcher's (Hugh Bonneville) lovelorn secretary Sally Owen in Twenty Twelve, a comedy series about planning for the 2012 Olympic Games in London.

Colman rejoined Considine in 2011 for his feature-film directorial debut, Tyrannosaur, receiving the BIFA Award for Best Performance by an Actress in a British Independent Film and the Empire Award for Best Actress. She played Carol Thatcher that year in the Academy Award-winning drama The Iron Lady, with Meryl Streep and Jim Broadbent, for which she received the London Film Critics' Circle Award for British Actress of the Year.

In 2013, Colman began playing DS Ellie Miller in ITV's Broadchurch. The crime-drama series, set in the fictional Dorset town of Broadchurch, follows the residents of a tightly-knit community after a young boy is found dead on a beach under suspicious circumstances. She was nominated for an International Emmy Award for Best Actress and received a BAFTA TV Award for Best Actress for her performance. Colman starred (with Vanessa Redgrave) that year as Margaret Lea in the BBC television film, The Thirteenth Tale.

She starred in Yorgos Lanthimos' 2015 absurdist dystopian film, The Lobster, with Rachel Weisz and Colin Farrell. The film premiered at the 2015 Cannes Film Festival, where it competed for the Palme d'Or and received the Jury Prize. Colman was nominated for the London Film Critics' Circle Award for Supporting Actress of the Year and received the BIFA Award for Best Supporting Actress.

Colman was praised for her performance as Angela Burr in the 2016 AMC-BBC miniseries The Night Manager, for which she was nominated for a Primetime Emmy Award and received a Golden Globe Award for Best Supporting Actress – Series, Miniseries or Television Film. She starred as Deborah Flowers that year in the Channel 4 black-comedy series, Flowers. Colman voiced Strawberry in the Netflix-BBC animated miniseries, Watership Down. She played Hildegarde Schmidt, Princess Dragomiroff's lady's maid, in Kenneth Branagh's 2017 remake of Agatha Christie's Murder on the Orient Express.

In 2018, Colman starred as Queen Anne in Lanthimos' film The Favourite with Emma Stone and Rachel Weisz. In preparation for the role, she gained 2 st 7 lbs (35 lb, or 16 kg). For her performance, Colman received the Golden Globe Award for Best Actress – Motion Picture Comedy or Musical, the BAFTA Award for Best Actress in a Leading Role, and the Academy Award for Best Actress. Her awestruck, humorous Academy Award acceptance speech was widely covered by the media.

Colman received positive reviews for her supporting role as Madame Thénardier in the 2018 BBC miniseries Les Misérables, an adaptation of the novel of the same name. In August 2019, she was confirmed as a guest star (as Lily) in the thirty-second season of the animated comedy series The Simpsons.

In October 2017, Colman was cast as Queen Elizabeth II for the third and fourth seasons of the Netflix historical drama series The Crown; the third season was released in November 2019. For her performance, she received two Screen Actors Guild Awards for Outstanding Performance by an Ensemble in a Drama Series, a Golden Globe Award for Best Actress – Television Series Drama, and a Primetime Emmy Award for Outstanding Lead Actress in a Drama Series. The fourth season was released on 15 November 2020, to critical acclaim.

2020s: Continued acclaim
Colman starred with Anthony Hopkins in Florian Zeller's 2020 film adaptation of his stage play, The Father, which focuses on an elderly man dealing with memory loss. The film premiered to critical acclaim at the Sundance Film Festival and was picked up for distribution by Sony Pictures Classics. It began a limited release on 26 February 2021, after originally being scheduled for release on 18 December 2020. Hopkins and Colman received widespread praise for their performances, as did the film for its accurate depiction of dementia. It received six Academy Award nominations (including Best Picture) and Colman was nominated for the Academy Award for Best Supporting Actress.

In 2021, she had roles in the drama films Mothering Sunday and The Electrical Life of Louis Wain and in the science-fiction animated films The Mitchells vs. the Machines and Ron's Gone Wrong. Colman was executive producer and starred with David Thewlis in the HBO true-crime miniseries Landscapers created by her husband, Ed Sinclair. The series and Colman's performance, were critically praised.

Colman also starred that year in Maggie Gyllenhaal's psychological drama The Lost Daughter, an adaptation of the novel of the same name by Elena Ferrante. Her performance was critically praised and she was nominated for the Golden Globe Award, Screen Actors Guild Award, and Academy Award for Best Actress. In 2022, Colman appeared as Sarah Nelson in the Netflix coming-of-age series Heartstopper and received the inaugural Children's and Family Emmy Award for Outstanding Guest Performance for her performance in the first season.

Also in 2022, Colman starred in the coming-of-age comedy film Joyride. She played the lead role in the romantic drama film Empire of Light, directed by Sam Mendes. For her performance in the film, she earned positive reviews and a Golden Globe Award nomination. She also had starring voice roles in the DreamWorks animated film Puss in Boots: The Last Wish and in Netflix's Scrooge: A Christmas Carol.

Colman will star in the Disney+ miniseries Secret Invasion, set in the Marvel Cinematic Universe. It is scheduled to premiere in 2023. She was cast in the musical film Wonka, which explores Willy Wonka's origins as a prequel to the Roald Dahl novel Charlie and the Chocolate Factory. It is scheduled for release on 15 December 2023. Colman will also star as Miss Havisham in the FX / BBC period drama series Great Expectations, based on Charles Dickens' novel of the same name.

Personal life
While performing in a late-1990s Footlights production of Sir Alan Ayckbourn's Table Manners, Colman met Ed Sinclair, a third-year law student who had become disillusioned with law and preferred to write. Colman and Sinclair married in August 2001 and have three children. They live in South London.

Since 2013, Colman has been a judge of the Norwich Film Festival. In August 2014, she was one of 200 public figures who signed a letter to The Guardian opposing Scottish independence in the run-up to the September 2014 referendum on the issue. She signed an open letter in November 2020 condemning violence and discrimination against trans women.

Philanthropy

Colman presented two of the 2013 Mind Media Awards, which celebrate accurate, responsible and sensitive portrayals of mental health across the media. Colman believes that "the media industry has huge influence and with that comes a responsibility to contest the stigma that sadly still exists, through accurate representation". She has spoken openly to the Big Issue about her experience of postnatal depression after the birth of her first child.

Inspired by her research for the film Tyrannosaur, in 2014 Colman became the patron of the UK charity Tender, which uses theatre and the arts to educate young people about preventing violence and sexual abuse. Colman has said that domestic-violence prevention can make a difference in the lives of young people. Other charity work included participating in the Alzheimer's Society's Holkham Hall Memory Walk in September 2013. Colman's great-grandmother suffered from dementia and her mother was involved in running a nursing home for patients. She has also supported charity campaigns for the Marie Curie Great Daffodil Appeal for the terminally ill.

In December 2014, Colman was involved in a BBC Radio documentary about the plight of women in Afghanistan for Amnesty International UK. Several women who told their stories to journalist Lyse Doucet were unable to appear because their lives might have been at risk; Colman read their stories as part of the documentary and said that the UK must not abandon Afghan women to the Taliban. An ambassador for UNICEF UK since 2015, she became its president in 2020.

Colman became patron of the Anthony Nolan blood-cancer charity in 2018, which she said helped a friend of hers.

Acting credits

Film

Television

Theatre

Accolades

Colman has received a number of awards, including an Academy Award, three British Academy Television Awards, a British Academy Film Award, four British Independent Film Awards, three Golden Globe Awards, two Critics' Choice Movie Awards, five Satellite Awards, two Screen Actors Guild Awards, two Emmy Awards, a Volpi Cup, and a BFI Fellowship. For her performance in the miniseries The Night Manager (2016), she received a Golden Globe Award and was nominated for a Primetime Emmy Award. Colman received another Primetime Emmy Award nomination for the comedy series Fleabag (2016–2019). For her portrayal of Queen Elizabeth II in the Netflix period drama series The Crown (2019–2020), she received two Screen Actors Guild Awards, a Golden Globe Award, and a Primetime Emmy Award.

For her portrayal of Anne, Queen of Great Britain in the period black-comedy film The Favourite (2018), she received the Academy Award for Best Actress, the Golden Globe Award for Best Actress – Motion Picture Comedy or Musical, and the BAFTA Award for Best Actress in a Leading Role. For her performance in the drama film The Father (2020), she was nominated for the Golden Globe Award, the Screen Actors Guild Award, the Critics' Choice Movie Award, and the Academy Award for Best Supporting Actress. For her performance in the psychological drama film The Lost Daughter (2021), Colman was nominated for the Golden Globe Award, the Screen Actors Guild Award, and the Academy Award for Best Actress. She was appointed Commander of the Order of the British Empire (CBE) in the 2019 Birthday Honours for her services to drama.

See also
List of British actors
List of actors with Academy Award nominations
List of British Academy Award nominees and winners
List of actors with two or more Academy Award nominations in acting categories

References

External links

Olivia Colman at the British Film Institute

1974 births
Living people
20th-century English actresses
21st-century English actresses
Actors from Norwich
Age controversies
Alumni of Bristol Old Vic Theatre School
Alumni of Homerton College, Cambridge
Audiobook narrators
Best Actress AACTA International Award winners
Best Actress Academy Award winners
Best Actress BAFTA Award winners
Best Actress BAFTA Award (television) winners
Best Drama Actress Golden Globe (television) winners
Best Female Comedy Performance BAFTA Award (television) winners
Best Musical or Comedy Actress Golden Globe (film) winners
Best Supporting Actress AACTA International Award winners
Best Supporting Actress BAFTA Award (television) winners
Best Supporting Actress Golden Globe (television) winners
British people of Anglo-Indian descent
Commanders of the Order of the British Empire
English film actresses
English people of French descent
English stage actresses
English television actresses
English voice actresses
English women comedians
European Film Award for Best Actress winners
Outstanding Performance by a Lead Actress in a Drama Series Primetime Emmy Award winners
People educated at Gresham's School
People educated at Norwich High School for Girls
Volpi Cup for Best Actress winners